The Ninth Day is a 2004 German historical drama film directed by Volker Schlöndorff and starring Ulrich Matthes and August Diehl. It was released by Kino International.

The film is about a Catholic priest from Luxembourg who is imprisoned in Dachau concentration camp, but released for nine days. The story is based on a portion of Pfarrerblock 25487, the diary of Father Jean Bernard (1907–1994), which was translated into English by Deborah Lucas Schneider as Priestblock 25487: A Memoir of Dachau.

Synopsis
Henri Kremer, a Catholic priest from Luxemburg, is imprisoned in Dachau. He experiences the horrors of the camps, including the crucifixion of some of his fellow prisoners, when one day he is given an unexpected leave of nine days. He returns to his native city, where the young SS officer Gebhardt tells him that he should convince his bishop to cooperate with the Nazis. Gebhardt, himself a former candidate for the priesthood, tries to convince the priest that the role of Judas is just what God wants from him. Kremer is confronted with a hard decision: Should he betray his Church or should he return to the concentration camp?

External links
 Official Website
 
 Press book
 The Ninth Day Web site in Luxembourg
 H. Marcuse's page comparing film and memoir
 Detailed review in Opuszine
 Decentfilms.com review

2004 films
2004 drama films
German war drama films
2000s German-language films
Czech war drama films
Luxembourgian war films
German World War II films
Films directed by Volker Schlöndorff
Films shot in the Czech Republic
Luxembourgian drama films
2000s German films
Czech World War II films